Agla María Albertsdóttir (born 5 August 1999) is an Icelandic footballer who plays as a forward or an attacking midfielder for Breiðablik on loan from BK Häcken. She has won the Icelandic championship twice in 2016 and 2018, as well as the Icelandic Cup once in 2018.

Playing career

Club career
Agla María came up through the junior ranks of Breiðablik and was first called up to the senior team in 2014 when she was an unused sub in a Úrvalsdeild kvenna game against Selfoss. On 30 June 2015 Agla María moved to Valur where she made her professional debut on 17 July 2015, when she replaced Hildur Antonsdóttir in the 46th minute of a defeated against Þór/KA. On 14 January 2016 she signed with Stjarnan. She won the Icelandic championship with the club in September that year.

In January 2018, Agla María signed back with Breiðablik. In August 2018, she assisted in both goals in  Breiðablik's 2–1 victory against Stjarnan in the Icelandic Cup Finals. On 17 September, she helped Breiðablik win the national championship after it defeated Selfoss in the Úrvalsdeild kvenna. In March 2019, she signed a new 3-year contract with Breiðablik.

National team career
Agla María debuted for Iceland U17 on 13 April 2014, at 15 years old, in a match against Wales. She participated in all the six matches Iceland U17 played in the 2016 UEFA Women's Under-17 Championship qualification. On 4 April 2015 Agla María debuted for Iceland U19 in a match against France. She subsequently was part of the group that tried to qualify for the 2015 UEFA Women's Under-19 Championship and for the 2016 UEFA Women's Under-19 Championship. On 6 April 2017 Agla María debuted for Iceland Senior Team in a match against Slovakia. On 22 June 2017 she was called by coach Freyr Alexandersson to represent Iceland at the UEFA Women's Euro 2017. She participated in all three matches Iceland played in the competition.

Honours

Club
Breiðablik
Icelandic champion (2):
2016, 2018
Icelandic Cup:
2017

Individual
 Úrvalsdeild Player of the Year: 2021
 Úrvalsdeild Golden Boot: 2020

References

External links
 
 
 
 

1999 births
Living people
Agla Maria Albertsdottir
Agla Maria Albertsdottir
Women's association football forwards
Women's association football midfielders
Agla Maria Albertsdottir
Agla Maria Albertsdottir
Valur (women's football) players
Breiðablik women's football players
UEFA Women's Euro 2022 players
UEFA Women's Euro 2017 players